Al-Qasim, formerly known as "Sura" in Aramaic, is a city in Babil Governorate, Iraq.

Background
Al-Qasim is named after Al-Qasim bin Musa al-Kadhim, whose tomb is located there.

References

External links
Al Qasim, Iraq Page

Qasim